Diamantino dos Santos (born 3 February 1961) is a Brazilian long-distance runner. He competed in the men's marathon at the 1988, 1992 and the 1996 Summer Olympics.

References

1961 births
Living people
Athletes (track and field) at the 1988 Summer Olympics
Athletes (track and field) at the 1992 Summer Olympics
Athletes (track and field) at the 1996 Summer Olympics
Brazilian male long-distance runners
Brazilian male marathon runners
Olympic athletes of Brazil
Place of birth missing (living people)
20th-century Brazilian people
21st-century Brazilian people